Hath (born 6 June 1964) is a Laotian sports shooter. He competed in the mixed 50 metre rifle prone event at the 1980 Summer Olympics.

References

1964 births
Living people
Laotian male sport shooters
Olympic shooters of Laos
Shooters at the 1980 Summer Olympics
Place of birth missing (living people)